McElroy Glacier is a glacier in Antarctica.

Description 
McElroy Glacier is a tributary glacier just west of Matthews Ridge on Tapsell Foreland in Victoria Land. It drains to the south to join nearby Barnett Glacier.

Mapping 
It was mapped by the United States Geological Survey from surveys and U.S. Navy air photos in 1960–63, and was named by the Advisory Committee on Antarctic Names after Clifford T. McElroy, a United States Antarctic Research Program geologist at McMurdo Station from 1964–65 and 1966–67.

References

Glaciers of Pennell Coast